Arising from the Surface (Hindi: सतह से उठता आदमी) is a 1980 Indian film directed by Mani Kaul. It was screened in the Un Certain Regard section at the 1981 Cannes Film Festival. This is an essay film grounded in the writings of Gajanan Madhav Muktibodh the prominent 20th century Hindi writer, poet, essayist, literary and political critic.

Plot
The screenplay of this film is based on two poems, two essays and six short stories by Gajanan Madhav Muktibodh and the title of film is taken from one of his short story used in the film. The film is neither a biopic nor an adaptation, or an essay, nor fiction, and yet it engages with all these forms producing a cinematic text that defies any categorization. The narrative is fashioned around three characters: Ramesh (Bharath Gopi) who embodies Muktibodh's subjectivity where as Madhav (Jha) and Keshav (M. K. Raina) are his companions. All three saunter in and out of numerous mise-en-scène, driven by the political, philosophical underpinnings of Muktibodh's universe.

Cast
 Bharath Gopi as Ramesh
 Vibhuti Jha as Madhav
 Satyen Kumar
 M. K. Raina as Keshav

References

External links

1980 films
1980s Hindi-language films
Indian avant-garde and experimental films
1980 drama films
Films directed by Mani Kaul
1980s avant-garde and experimental films
Indian drama films
Hindi-language drama films